Lake Saltonstall may refer to:

 Lake Saltonstall (Connecticut), in south-central Connecticut
 Lake Saltonstall (Massachusetts), in Haverhill, Massachusetts